The second and final season of the television series Sonny with a Chance aired on Disney Channel from March 14, 2010 to January 2, 2011. The six main characters are Sonny Munroe (Demi Lovato), Tawni Hart (Tiffany Thornton), Chad Dylan Cooper (Sterling Knight), Nico Harris (Brandon Mychal Smith), Grady Mitchell (Doug Brochu), and Zora Lancaster (Allisyn Ashley Arm).

Recurring cast members and guest stars this season include Michael Kostroff, Nancy McKeon, Vicki Lewis, G. Hannelius, Estelle Harris, Carol Locatell, Larry Gelman, Lou Ferrigno, Shaquille O'Neal, Allstar Weekend, Joe Jonas and Raven-Symoné.

Production
Disney Channel renewed Sonny for a second season on June 1, 2009, alongside the fourth season of Hannah Montana. Production for the series moved from NBC Studios in Burbank, California to Hollywood Center Studios in Hollywood, California. Episodes were taped from November 2, 2009 and ended on June 4, 2010.

Opening sequence
The opening sequence for season two remains virtually the same, with only the portion where Sonny knocks the title logo into place being reshot.

Episodes

References

External links

2010 American television seasons
2011 American television seasons
Season 2